Martin McAleese (born 24 March 1951) is an Irish politician, dentist and accountant who has served as the Chancellor of Dublin City University since August 2011. He served as a Senator from 2011 to 2013, after being Nominated by the Taoiseach. He is the husband of the 8th President of Ireland, Mary McAleese.

Early life, education and family
McAleese was born in Belfast in 1951. He was educated at St Mary's Christian Brothers' Grammar School, Belfast. He then studied at Queen's University Belfast, obtaining an honours Bachelor of Science in Physics. He played Gaelic football for the Antrim Minors and was captain of the team in 1969. In 1972, after he graduated he moved to Dublin and trained there as an accountant with the chartered accountancy firm of Stokes, Kennedy, Crowley. He later worked as financial controller for an Aer Lingus subsidiary.

McAleese married Mary Leneghan in 1976. The couple resided in Scholarstown, Dublin, for a short period, and then for almost twelve years near Ratoath, County Meath. In 1980, he returned to full-time education at Trinity College Dublin, to study as a dentist, subsequently moving back, with his family, to Northern Ireland, where he practised as a dentist in Crossmaglen and Bessbrook, County Armagh.

Public service career
While his wife served as President of Ireland, McAleese initiated a series of meetings with senior Ulster loyalist paramilitary leaders to pursue peace negotiations. These actions did not take place without controversy, but have been widely viewed as instrumental in bringing loyalist paramilitary groups to peace talks.

In May 2011, McAleese was appointed as a Senator by the Taoiseach Enda Kenny. In August 2011, he was appointed the Chancellor of Dublin City University, taking over from David Byrne.

On 1 February 2013, McAleese announced his intention to resign as a member of Seanad Éireann.

McAleese accepted an appointment as Chairman of the Inter-Departmental Committee which was set up by the Government of Ireland to investigate the Magdalene laundries. His findings have been criticised by some survivors and researchers from the Magdalene Names project.

On 18–19 October 2014, McAleese attended the One Young World Summit in Dublin as a keynote speaker. Here, he hosted a special session for the One Young World Peace and Conflict Resolution Project alongside former Ulster Defence Association (UDA) prisoner Jackie McDonald and former Irish Republican Army (IRA) prisoner Sean Murray. They addressed young people from 191 countries to share and develop ideas to strengthen efforts at conflict resolution in their own countries.

Personal life

Martin and his wife Mary have three children. The family moved to Rostrevor, County Down, in 1987, when Martin set up practice in County Armagh.

References

1951 births
People from County Antrim
People educated at St. Mary's Christian Brothers' Grammar School, Belfast
Alumni of Trinity College Dublin
Irish dentists
Accountants from Northern Ireland
Members of the 24th Seanad
Recipients of the Order of the Cross of Terra Mariana, 1st Class
Spouses of presidents of Ireland
Nominated members of Seanad Éireann
Independent members of Seanad Éireann
Chancellors of Dublin City University
Living people